Arizona Department of Veterans' Services

History

Arizona has provided services to Arizona Veterans since 1925, when it created the position of Veterans’ Service Officer. This position was abolished in 1951 and replaced by the Arizona Veterans’ Service Commission. In 1973, the Commission was integrated into the Department of Economic Security. Primarily at the request of various Veterans’ organizations, the Governor reestablished the Commission as a separate agency in 1982. In 1999, the Legislature separated the Commission from the agency by making the Commission an advisory body and creating a separate Department of Veterans’ Services headed by a governor-appointed director.

Department services

The Arizona Department of Veterans’ Services provides direct services to Veterans through the administration of 19 Veterans Benefits Offices throughout the state to help Veterans connect with their VA benefits, two skilled nursing Veteran Home facilities in Phoenix and Tucson to provide short and long term care, one Veterans' Memorial Cemetery in Sierra Vista with additional cemeteries in Northern Arizona and Maran. A fiduciary may provide conservator and guardian services for incapacitated veterans.

In addition, the Arizona Department of Veterans’ Services provides critical, statewide coordination and technical assistance to services and organizations serving Veterans.  This includes activities such as coordinating services across private and public sectors in serving targeted populations such as Veterans experiencing homelessness and Women Veterans, as well as building community capacity to address Veteran employment and higher education.

Services provided by the Arizona Department of Veterans’ Services were instrumental in connecting Arizona’s nearly 600,000 Veterans with nearly $2,712,810,000 in Compensation, Pension, Educational and Medical benefits and grants from the United States Department of Veterans Affairs in FY 2012.

Leadership
 Patrick Chorpenning, 1st Director of Veterans Services, (1999–2007)
 Richard Gregg Maxon, BG (USA, ret.), 2nd Director of Veterans' Services, (2007–2008)
 Joey Strickland, Col (USA, ret.), 3rd Director of Veterans Services, (2008–2013)
 Ted Vogt, 4th Director of Veterans' Services, (2013–2015)
 Wanda Wright, Col (USAF, ret.), 5th Director of Veterans' Services, (2015– ).

Veterans
1982 establishments in Arizona
State departments of veterans affairs in the United States